Ngor is a monastery in the Ü-Tsang province of Tibet

 Ngor, Dakar, a commune of Senegal
 A Cambodian Hakka Romanization of the surname 吳, known as Ng or Wu
 Ngor Royal Cup, lowest level of club football competition which competed in the tournament in Thailand since 1963
 Ngor Okpala, a Local Government Area of Imo State, Nigeria

See also
 Ngo (disambiguation)